The Labour Democratic Party, previously known as Labour Democracy, was an anti-fascist, social-democratic, and social-liberal political party in Italy. Founded in 1943 as the heir of defunct Italian Reformist Socialist Party, it was formed by members of the Italian Socialist Party who wanted to cooperate with the Italian Liberal Party, the heir of the Liberal Union, which governed Italy from the days of Giovanni Giolitti. Leading members of the party were Ivanoe Bonomi, Meuccio Ruini, and Enrico Molè.

History
The party became one of the six members of the National Liberation Committee, which governed Italy during the war against Italian fascism from 1944 to 1946. After having took part at the 1946 Italian general election within the National Democratic Union, composed of Benedetto Croce's Italian Liberal Party and pre-Fascist leading Liberal politicians, such as Vittorio Emanuele Orlando and Francesco Saverio Nitti, some members joined the Italian Democratic Socialist Party, of which Bonomi was honorary chairman from 1947 until his death in 1951. Others joined the Italian Socialist Party, and the Italian Communist Party and the Italian Liberal Party as independents.

Electoral results

Italian Parliament

Notes
 In 1946 elections, the DL ran alone in some provinces and under the National Democratic Union in some others, and elected one and eight deputies.

Labour parties
Anti-fascist organisations in Italy
Liberal parties in Italy
Political parties established in 1943
Political parties disestablished in 1948
Defunct political parties in Italy
1943 establishments in Italy
1948 disestablishments in Italy